Qin Liang (born 29 March 1979) is an international football referee from China. She has been officiating international since 2011.

In December 2018, Liang was appointed to be a referee at the 2019 FIFA Women's World Cup in France.

References

1979 births
Living people
Chinese football referees
FIFA Women's World Cup referees
Women association football referees
People from Dunhuang